XFM 96.3 was an Expat radio station of Mediacorp in Singapore. Broadcasting on 96.3 MHz, it was Singapore's only radio station that broadcast a mix of Japanese, French, Korean, Hindi, Bangladeshi and German programmes. A blend of World Music from Brazil, Greece, Italy, Lebanon and Spain would also be played during an automated music marathon daily.

History
Both the Media Development Authority (MDA) and Mediacorp have done a review and mutually agreed to cease transmission of the station on 30 September 2016, given the rapidly changing radio landscape. Mediacorp stated that the review was "driven by new technologies and evolving radio listenership preferences". Staff will be redeployed to other positions thereafter.

In 2016, the reused frequency (as well as a newly vacated 89.3 frequency) were tendered and won by SPH Radio. In 2018, 96.3 Hao FM was launched and broadcast using the 96.3 frequency.

See also
List of radio stations in Singapore

References

External links
XFM 96.3 Official Website

Radio stations in Singapore
Radio stations established in 1998
Radio stations disestablished in 2016
1998 establishments in Singapore
2016 disestablishments in Singapore